Morigia is a surname. Notable people with the surname include:

Bonincontro Morigia (fl. 14th century), Italian historical writer
Camillo Morigia (1743–1795), Italian architect
Giacomo Antonio Morigia (1633–1708), Italian Roman Catholic archbishop

See also
Morisia